DZDA (105.3 FM) Radyo Pangkaunlaran is a radio station owned and operated by the Department of Agriculture. Its studio and transmitter are located at the Regional Field Office grounds, Diversion Rd., Brgy. San Gabriel, Tuguegarao.

References

Radio stations in Cagayan